The 1884 Kansas gubernatorial election was held on November 4, 1884. Republican nominee John Martin defeated Democratic incumbent George Washington Glick with 55.34% of the vote.

General election

Candidates
Major party candidates 
John Martin, Republican
George Washington Glick, Democratic

Other candidates
H.L. Phillips, Greenback Labor

Results

References

1884
Kansas
Gubernatorial